Druten is a municipality and a town in the eastern Netherlands. The municipality covers the eastern part of the  region of the province of Gelderland. 

One of its key features is the town's church, designed by architect Pierre Cuypers. The church is dedicated to the Two Ewalds, with statues for the two made in the studio , owned by Cuypers and Frans Stoltzenberg.

Population centres

Topography

Dutch topographic map of the municipality of Druten, June 2015

Notable residents
 Reginald Wolfe (died 1573) a Dutch-born English Protestant printer, an original member of the Royal Stationers' Company
 Josef van Schaik (1882–1962) & Steef van Schaik (1888–1968) Dutch politician and brothers
 Ru Paré (1896-1972), a Dutch resistance member, and visual artist
 Peter Hans Kolvenbach (1928–2016) the twenty-ninth Superior General of the Society of Jesus
 Jasmijn Lau (1999-) Dutch athlete, long distance runner

Gallery

References

External links

Official website

 
Municipalities of Gelderland
Populated places in Gelderland